Wagon Wheel is an unincorporated community in Torrance County, New Mexico, United States.

References

External links
New Mexico Ghost Towns - Wagon Wheel

Unincorporated communities in Torrance County, New Mexico
Unincorporated communities in New Mexico
Albuquerque metropolitan area
Ghost towns in New Mexico